Swain's First Bike Ride is the debut studio album by the Berkeley, California-based punk rock band Fifteen. It was originally released on vinyl in 1991 through Lookout Records with the catalog number LK 040. The songs can generally be described as mid-tempo punk rock with pop sensibilities. The album also has quite a few love songs (including "C#(tion)", which was covered by Green Day, and "Sweet Valentine"), which was something that was phased out on later albums. The record closes with Fifteen's only piano ballad, "The End", which is often considered to be one of the band's best songs. The album's CD edition, released on February 10, 1992, contains the band's self-titled EP from the previous year as bonus tracks. The album was re-released in 2017 by Dead Broke Records on vinyl, CD, and digitally.

Track listing

Personnel 
 Jeff Ott – lead vocals, guitar, piano
 Jack Curran (credited as Tommy Moreno) – bass, backing vocals
 Mark Moreno – drums, backing vocals
 Mikey Mischief – drums on CD bonus tracks

Production
 Kevin Army – producer
 Andy Ernst – producer of CD bonus tracks
 John Golden – mastering

Fifteen (band) albums
1992 debut albums
Lookout! Records albums